The following is a list of schools in the Northwest Territories, Canada.

Schools

Enrolment and graduation

See also
List of school districts in the Northwest Territories
List of schools in Canada
Log School House

References

External links

 Beaufort Delta Education Council
 Commission scolaire francophone des Territoires du Nord-Ouest (CSFTNO)
 Dehcho Divisional Education Council
 Sahtu Divisional Education Council
 South Slave Divisional Education Council
 Tlicho Community Services Agency
 Yellowknife Catholic Schools
 Yellowknife Education District No.1

Education in the Northwest Territories
Northwest Territories
Schools